Mario Lička (born 30 April 1982) is a Czech football coach and former player. He works currently as an assistant of FC Orenburg in Russian Premier League, where his brother Marcel Lička serving as a manager.

Career

Early career
Lička began his footballing career at Czech club Baník Ostrava in 2002. He played at Bazaly until January 2005, making sixty-five appearances. Lička was a member of the squad of Baník Ostrava in the 2003–2004 season, when Baník won the league title. He was sold to 1. FC Slovácko where he made 28 league appearances in 2005-06 and was released in July 2006.

Southampton
He had an unsuccessful trial at West Ham United and Leeds United before signing for Southampton F.C., following another trial. After an injury hit first couple of months at the club, Lička forced his way into manager George Burley's plans, scoring his first goal for the club in a 1–0 win over Stoke City on 21 October 2006. However not long after he became surplus to Burley's requirements and found himself playing in the reserves. After the appointment of new manager Nigel Pearson in February 2008, Licka was given a new chance and after a series of good performances found himself playing regularly again. However after the return of former Chairman Rupert Lowe, Pearson did not have his short-term contract renewed despite saving the club from relegation. Lowe did not offer Lička a new contract as he was also at the end of his contract.

Later career
Despite reported interest from Pearson at his new managerial post at Leicester City, Lička chose to return to his homeland to play for Baník Ostrava. In June 2010 he signed for the French club Stade Brestois for three seasons. Lička subsequently played for Slavia Prague.

Coaching career
Lička served as an assistant in SK Benešov and Sokol Hostouň.

Personal life 
His father Verner Lička was a very successful footballer, then manager. His brother Marcel is also a footballer, then manager.

References

External links
 
 
 
 
 
 

1982 births
Sportspeople from Ostrava
Living people
Czechoslovak footballers
Czech footballers
Czech Republic under-21 international footballers
Czech Republic international footballers
Association football midfielders
FC Baník Ostrava players
U.S. Livorno 1915 players
1. FC Slovácko players
Southampton F.C. players
Stade Brestois 29 players
SK Slavia Prague players
FC Istres players
FK Chmel Blšany players
SK Benešov players
Czech First League players
Serie A players
English Football League players
Ligue 1 players
Championnat National players
Ekstraklasa players
Bohemian Football League players
Czech expatriate footballers
Czechoslovak expatriate footballers
Expatriate footballers in Italy
Expatriate footballers in England
Expatriate footballers in France
Expatriate footballers in Belgium
Expatriate footballers in Poland
Czechoslovak expatriate sportspeople in Belgium
Czechoslovak expatriate sportspeople in France
Bruk-Bet Termalica Nieciecza players